A snowball fight is a physical game in which balls of snow are thrown with the intention of hitting somebody else. The game is similar to dodgeball in its major factors, though typically less organized. This activity is primarily played during winter when there is sufficient snowfall.

Two examples of organized games involving snowball fights are Yukigassen and SheenAab Jung. Yukigassen (雪合戦) is a snowball fighting-competition from Japan. SheenAab Jung (aka 'Snow Fighting') is played in Jammu and Kashmir of India.

History

Legal prohibition
In 1472, the city council of Amsterdam allegedly prohibited snowball fights for reasons of public safety, a prohibition which occasionally finds its way into lists of strange laws. The law, if it ever existed, is not presently enforced.

Several localities have passed ordinances prohibiting snowball fights, typically as part of a larger prohibition on thrown missiles. In 2018, the town council of Severance, Colorado unanimously overturned one such ban after hearing from a local youth. Similarly, after its "snowball ordinance" became the subject of national news coverage, the city of Wausau, Wisconsin chose to remove the word "snowball" from a list of dangerous objects specifically prohibited from being thrown on public property.

Large snowball fights
During the American Civil War, on January 29, 1863, the largest military snow exchange occurred in the Rappahannock Valley in Northern Virginia. What began as a few hundred men from Texas plotting a friendly fight against their Arkansas camp mates soon escalated into a brawl that involved 9,000 soldiers of the Army of Northern Virginia.

In his memoir of the American Civil War, Samuel H. Sprott describes a snowball battle that occurred early in 1864 involving the Army of Tennessee.  Sprott states that the fight started when Strahl’s Brigade was attacked by a brigade of Breckenridge’s Division, but soon other brigades became involved, and ultimately five or six thousand men were engaged.

On January 29, 2005, a crowd of 3,027 people gathered in the town of Wauconda, Illinois for a snowball fight organized by Bill Lutz, with the town receiving a mention in the 2006 Guinness Book of World Records.

On October 14, 2009, 5,768 people in Leuven, Belgium took part in a University of Pennsylvania-funded snowball fight and broke the world record for the largest snowball fight.

On December 9, 2009, an estimated crowd of over 4,000 students at the University of Wisconsin–Madison participated in a snowball fight on Bascom Hill. There were reports of several injuries, mainly broken noses, and a few incidences of vandalism, mainly stolen lunch trays from Memorial Union. The snowball fight was scheduled weeks in advance, and was helped by the fact that the University canceled all classes due to 12–16 inches of snow that fell the night before. However, this snowball fight failed to break the record set in October of the same year in Leuven.

On January 22, 2010, 5,387 people in Taebaek, South Korea, set the world record for most people engaged in a snowball fight.

On February 6, 2010, some 2,000 people met at Dupont Circle in Washington, D.C. for a snowball fight organized over the internet after over two feet of snow fell in the region during the North American blizzards of 2010. The event was promoted via Facebook and Twitter. At least a half-dozen D.C. and U.S. Park police cars were positioned around Dupont Circle throughout the snowball fight. Minor injuries were reported.

On January 12, 2013, 5,834 people officially took part in Seattle, Washington set the Guinness World Records record for the world's largest snowball fight, during Seattle's Snow Day.

On February 8, 2013, nearly 2,500 students of the Boston University participated in a snowball fight on Boston's Esplanade facilitated by historic winter storm "Nemo".

Yukigassen (雪合戦) is a snowball fighting-competition originating in Japan. There are annual Yukigassen tournaments in Japan, Finland, Norway, Russia, Sweden, the United States and Canada.

Seattle's world record was broken on January 31, 2016 in Saskatoon, Canada, where more than 20,000 participants came to Victoria park to attempt the Guinness World Record. Rick Mercer was one of the participants who came to shoot an episode about Team Canada's Yukigassen team and compete in the world record. Underestimating the number of participants the event ran out of their 8200 wristbands hours before the competition took place. In total 7,681 participants was the official Guinness record and was achieved by the City of Saskatoon thanks to Yukigassen Team Canada.

The event was organized to send off Team Canada for the Showa Shinzan International Yukigassen World Championships, an annual professional snowball fighting competition.

See also
 Yukigassen
 SheenAab Jung
 Winter holiday season
 Bataille de neige (Short film, 1897)

References

External links

 Showa-Shinzan International Yukigassen
 Yukigassen Nordic Championship (Norwegian)
 European Championship
 Snow Info – rules for a snowball fight
 Last one standing - Swiss Snowball Association and World Snowball Union

Fight play
Snow
Play (activity)